Terry Lee Wells Nevada Discovery Museum, often known as The Discovery, is a science center and museum located in Reno, Nevada. The museum, a private non-profit, was founded in 2011 and is geared towards both children and adults. It showcases science, technology, engineering, art, and math permanent and special exhibits in its 67,000 square foot space.

History 
The Terry Lee Wells Nevada Discovery Museum concept came from Chris Riche, an entrepreneur who conducted a feasibility study on the need for Reno to have a science center. He eventually raised funds to create the organization and Terry Lee Wells Foundation donated $4 million. In return, the museum was named after their foundation. It is housed in the former Reno City Hall, though the location has undergone numerous renovations since the museum’s opening year.

Exhibits 
The Terry Lee Wells Nevada Discovery Museum is primarily a science center and offers interactive exhibits that both children and adult visitors can engage with. The following are some permanent installments that still exist in the museum to date.

Mindbender Mansion 
The exhibit is placed inside a Victorian mansion where both adult and child visitors can complete interactive problem-solving challenges intended for individuals and groups.

Inside Out: An Anatomy Experience 
Visitors who engage with this exhibit can explore the human body’s anatomy throughout, including their own. Both adult and child visitors can engage with this exhibit.

Little Discoveries 
The museum exhibits in this area are designed for children no older than five years old, ranging from hands-on car-building experience to geological displays.

See also 

 List of museums in Nevada
 List of science centers
 Science outreach

References 

Science centers
Science museums in Nevada
Reno, Nevada